
Gmina Niwiska is a rural gmina (administrative district) in Kolbuszowa County, Subcarpathian Voivodeship, in south-eastern Poland.

Villages
Gmina Niwiska contains the villages and settlements of Hucina, Hucisko, Kosowy, Leszcze, Niwiska, Przyłęk, Siedlanka, Trześń and Zapole.

Neighbouring gminas
Gmina Niwiska is bordered by the gminas of Cmolas, Kolbuszowa, Mielec, Ostrów, Przecław and Sędziszów Małopolski.

References
Polish official population figures 2006

Niwiska
Kolbuszowa County